The Saint Lucia Freedom Party was a political party in Saint Lucia led by human rights lawyer Martinus Francois. It contested the 2001 general elections, but received just 18 votes, failing to win a seat.

References

Political parties in Saint Lucia